Richard Ross Terry, Jr. (born April 5, 1974) is a retired American football defensive tackle in the NFL. He played from 1997 to 1999 for the New York Jets and the Carolina Panthers. He played college football at the University of North Carolina. He was drafted by the Jets in the 2nd round of the 1997 NFL Draft.

References

1974 births
Living people
People from Lexington, North Carolina
Players of American football from North Carolina
American football defensive tackles
North Carolina Tar Heels football players
New York Jets players
Carolina Panthers players